The military designation of days and hours within the North Atlantic Treaty Organization (NATO), is specified in AAP-6 (STANAG 3680), NATO Glossary of Terms and Definitions, and marked (NATO) in what follows. Those entries marked (US) are specific to the U.S., and defined only in Joint Publication JP 1-02, Department of Defense Dictionary of Military and Associated Terms.

References to days (or hours) preceding or following a designated day (or hour) use a plus or minus sign and an Arabic numeral following the letter. For example, "D−3" is 3 days prior to D-Day, "C+7" is 7 days after C-Day, "H−2" is 2 hours before H-hour, and so forth. In less formal contexts, the time is usually spelled out, so that "D−3" becomes "D minus three" or "D minus 3".

20 October 1944, the day the Leyte Island Operation (the invasion of Leyte) began.

Short for "Commencement Day" which usually means when deployment for an operation commences. It is called "Commencement Day" because before deployment candy is usually passed out to G.I.s from charitable organizations.  (US)

(redundant acronym of day since the D stands for day, so it means day-day)
The unnamed day on which an operation commences or is due to commence. This may be the commencement of hostilities or any other operation. The most famous D-Day was June 6, 1944, when "Operation Overlord" began. Contrary to popular belief, the "D" does not stand for any specific word – the most popular being disembark. (NATO).

The unnamed day on which a NATO exercise commences. (NATO)

The effective time of announcement by the U.S. Secretary of Defense to the Military Departments of a decision to mobilize Reserve units. (US)

The unnamed day on which an order, normally national, is given to deploy a unit. (NATO)

(redundant acronym of hour since the H stands for hour so it means hour-hour)
The specific time at which an operation or exercise commences, or is due to commence (this term is used also as a reference for the designation of days/hours before or after the event). (NATO); also known as Zero Hour

Used informally within the U.S. military bureaucracy to variously designate the "Implementation Day" or the (Delivery Order) "Issuance Day".

Used during both world wars  to designate the day an assault occurred.

The unnamed day on which a convoy system is introduced or is due to be introduced on any particular convoy lane. (NATO)

The specific time at which deployment for an operation commences. (US)

For "Landing Day", 1 April 1945, the day Operation Iceberg (the invasion of Okinawa) began.

The day on which mobilization commences or is due to commence.  (NATO)

The unnamed day an active duty unit is notified for deployment or redeployment. (US)

A Maritime Prepositioning Force (MPF, the vanguard of a Marine Air-Ground Task Force, MAGTF) term designating the day the Maritime Propositioning Ship Squadron (MPSRON) off-load begins, or the continuous flow of the Fly-In Echelon (FIE) commences, whichever is later.

The expected date at which the rate of production of a consumable equals the rate at which the item is required by the Armed Forces. (US)

23 June 1945, the day of the dress rehearsal of the first atom bomb test nowadays it is sometimes used informally to mean "Quality Day", or the first day of the calendar quarter.

The unnamed day on which redeployment of major combat, combat support, and combat service support forces begins in an operation. (US)

The unnamed day the President authorizes Selective Reserve callup (not more than 200,000 men). (US)

The effective day coincident with Presidential declaration of national emergency and authorization of partial mobilization (not more than 1,000,000 personnel exclusive of the 200,000 callup). (US)

Sometimes used to designate "Victory Day", the day an operation successfully concludes.

"Victory in Europe"; designates 8 May 1945, the date when the Allies formally celebrated the defeat of Nazi Germany.

"Victory over Japan"; designates 14 August 1945, the date of Japan's unconditional surrender.

The effective day the President takes the adversary decision to prepare for war (unambiguous strategic warning). (US)

1 November 1945, the day Operation Downfall (the invasion of Japan) was to begin. The term also generically means "attack day".

1 March 1946, the day Operation Coronet (the invasion of Tokyo Plains) was to occur.

10 June 1945, the day the Australian Imperial Forces landed in Brunei Bay to liberate Brunei, part of Operation Oboe Six.

References

Military terminology